Lesbian erotica deals with depictions in the visual arts of lesbianism, which is the expression of female-on-female sexuality. Lesbianism has been a theme in erotic art since at least the time of ancient Rome, and many regard depictions of lesbianism (as for sexuality in general) to be erotic.

For much of the history of cinema and television, lesbianism was considered taboo, though since the 1960s it has increasingly become a genre in its own right. First found in softcore movies and erotic thrillers, depictions of lesbianism entered mainstream cinema in the 1980s. In pornography, depictions of lesbian sex form a popular subgenre, directed toward male heterosexual audiences, lesbian audiences, and bisexual audiences of any gender.

Cultural background
Sexual relations between women have been illustrated as well as narrated, but much of the written material from the early modern period has been destroyed. What seems clear from the historical record is that much of the lesbian material in pornographic texts was intended for a male readership.

Visual arts

Classic and classical depictions

Depictions of lesbianism are found among the erotic frescoes of Pompeii. Having all but disappeared during the Middle Ages, they made a comeback after the Renaissance. François Boucher and J. M. W. Turner were among the forerunners of 19th century artists who featured eroticism between women among their work. Like other painters (such as Jean-Honoré Fragonard), Boucher found inspiration in classical mythology. He was one of many artists to use various myths surrounding the goddess Diana, including the often-depicted story of Callisto, Diana's nymph who was seduced by Jupiter, with the god taking Diana's form since Callisto had vowed chastity.

19th-century developments
In the 19th century, lesbianism became more openly discussed and found its way into many fields of art. In France, the influence of Charles Baudelaire is considered crucial, on literature as well as on the visual arts, though according to Dorothy Kosinski it was a matter not for the high arts but mostly for popular erotica. Auguste Rodin's illustrations for Baudelaire's Les Fleurs du Mal included lesbian scenes. Gustave Courbet's Le Sommeil (1866) illustrates a scene from the 1835 story "Mademoiselle de Maupin" by Théophile Gautier (though Baudelaire's "Delphine et Hippolyte" from Les fleurs is also cited as an inspiration), depicting two women asleep after love-making. Its lesbian subject matter was controversial enough to be the subject of a police report in 1872, but Courbet's painting is credited with inspiring others to depict "sapphic couple[s]", which in turn led to "soften[ing] taboos by revealing love between women and forcing society to see those whom it regarded as deviants and sinners." Nonetheless, the audience for such artwork was predominantly male (Courbet's painting was commissioned by a profligate Turkish diplomat), therefore "the term lesbian should perhaps be provided with quotation marks, insofar as we are dealing with images made by men, for men, and in which the very disposition of the women's bodies declares that they are arranged more for the eyes of the viewer than for those of one another." In the twentieth century the image's sensuality would appeal to lesbian viewers as well.

In 19th century French painting, lesbianism was often depicted within the context of orientalism, and was thus apt to be affected by the era's colonialism and imperialism; as a result, assumptions regarding race and class informed the images, especially when lesbianism was linked to harem and brothel scenes. Later depictions of lesbians in Western art may reflect like cultural mores, or merely borrow from formal pictorial conventions.

In the second half of the 19th century, the lesbian theme was well-established, and its artists include Henri de Toulouse-Lautrec, Constantin Guys, Edgar Degas, and Jean-Louis Forain. Later artists include Gustav Klimt, Egon Schiele, Christian Schad, Albert Marquet, Balthus, and Leonor Fini. More explicit depictions were an important part of the work of erotic illustrators such as Édouard-Henri Avril, Franz von Bayros, Martin van Maële, Rojan, Gerda Wegener, and Tom Poulton. Explicit depictions of lovemaking between women were also an important theme in Japanese erotic shunga, including the work of such masters as Utamaro, Hokusai, Katsukawa Shunchō, Utagawa Kunisada, Utagawa Kuniyoshi, Yanagawa Shigenobu, Keisai Eisen, and Kawanabe Kyōsai.

In art and fetish photography, notable artists to work with lesbian themes include David Hamilton, Steve Diet Goedde and Bob Carlos Clarke. More recently, lesbian and bisexual photographers such as Nan Goldin, Tee Corinne, and Judy Francesconi have focused on erotic themes, reclaiming a subject that has traditionally been mainly treated through the eye of male artists.

Cinema and television
Lesbian and erotic themes were restrained or coded in early cinema. Even scenes suggestive of lesbianism were controversial, such as the presentation of women dancing together in Pandora's Box (1929) and The Sign of the Cross (1932). Pandora's Box is notable for its lesbian subplot with the Countess (Alice Roberts) being defined by her masculine look and because she wears a tuxedo. Lesbian themes were found in European films such as Mädchen in Uniform (1931). By the mid-1930s, the Hays Code banned any homosexual themes in Hollywood-made films and several pre-Code films had to be cut to be re-released. For example, The Sign of the Cross originally included the erotic "Dance of the Naked Moon", but the dance was considered a "lesbian dance" and was cut for a 1938 reissue. Even suggestions of a romantic attraction between women were rare, and the "L-word" was taboo. Lesbianism was not treated in American cinema until the 1962 release of Walk on the Wild Side in which there is a subtly implied lesbian relationship between Jo and Hallie. Depictions of lovemaking between women first appeared in several films of the late 1960s – The Fox (1967), The Killing of Sister George (1968), and Therese and Isabelle (1968).

During the 1970s, depictions of sex between women were largely restricted to semi-pornographic softcore and sexploitation films, such as Cherry, Harry & Raquel! (1970), Score (1974), Emmanuelle (1974), Bilitis (1977) and 'Caligula (1979). Although semi-explicit heterosexual sex scenes had been part of mainstream cinema since the late 1960s, equivalent depictions of women having sex only began making their appearance in mainstream film during the 1980s. These were typically in the context of a film that was specifically lesbian-themed, such as Personal Best (1982), Lianna (1983), and Desert Hearts (1985). The vampire film The Hunger (1983) also contained a seduction and sex scene between Catherine Deneuve and Susan Sarandon. Jacques Saurel's film "Joy et Joan" (1985) also belongs to this new more-than-softcore film performance.Henry & June (1990) had several lesbian scenes, including one that was considered explicit enough to give the film an NC-17 rating. (There was some controversy as to whether the MPAA had given the film a more restrictive rating than it normally would have because of the lesbian nature of the scene in question.) Basic Instinct (1992) contained mild lesbian content, but established lesbianism as a theme in the erotic thriller genre. Later, in the 1990s, erotic thrillers such as Showgirls, Wild Side (1995), Crash (1996) and Bound (1996) explored lesbian relationships and contained explicit lesbian sex scenes.

From the 1990s, depictions of sex between women became fairly common in mainstream cinema. Females kissing has increasingly been shown in films and on television, often as a way to include a sexually arousing element in a film without actually having the film gain a more restrictive rating by depicting sex or nudity.

The Showtime drama series The L Word (2004–2009) explores lesbian, bisexual, and transgender relationships, and contains numerous explicit lesbian sex scenes.

Pornography

Lesbianism is an important theme in both hardcore and softcore pornography, with many adult video titles, websites, and entire studios (such as Girlfriends Films and Sweetheart Video) devoted entirely to depictions of lesbian sexual activity. Lesbian pornography typically is aimed predominantly at a male audience, with a smaller female audience, and many heterosexual adult videos include a lesbian sex scene. However, in Japanese adult video, lesbianism is considered a fetish and is only occasionally included in heterosexual videos. Rezu (レズ—lesbian) video is a specialized genre, though a large number of such videos are produced.

Audience
Erotica and pornography involving sex between women have been predominantly produced by men for a male and female audience. A 1996 study by Henry E. Adams, Lester W. Wright, Jr., and Bethany A. Lohr, published in the Journal of Abnormal Psychology, found that heterosexual men have the highest genital and subjective arousal to pornography depicting heterosexual activity, rather than lesbian activity. Another study indicated that heterosexual men are more aroused by depictions involving lesbian sex than they are by depictions of heterosexual activity, while heterosexual and lesbian women were aroused by a wide range of sexual stimuli. On-screen lesbian sex (in both Western and Japanese pornography), while typically aimed at a male audience, has developed a small lesbian audience as well, but still contrasts with gay male pornography, which is considered a genre of its own.

Deborah Swedberg, in an analysis published in the NWSA Journal in 1989, argues that it is possible for lesbian viewers to reappropriate lesbian porn. Swedberg notes that, typically, all-women films differ from mixed porn (with men and women) in, among other things, the settings (less anonymous and more intimate) and the very acts performed (more realistic and emotionally involved, and with a focus on the whole body rather than just the genitals): "the subject of the heterosexually produced all-women videos is female pleasure". She argues (against Laura Mulvey's "Visual Pleasure and Narrative Cineman" and Susanne Kappeler's Pornography and Representation, for example) that such movies allow for female subjectivity since the women are more than just objects of exchange. Appropriation by women of male-made lesbian erotica (such as by David Hamilton) was signaled also by Tee Corinne.

Some pornography is made by lesbians, such as the defunct lesbian erotic magazine On Our Backs; videos by Fatale Media, SIR Video, Pink and White Productions, and BLEU Productions; and web sites such as the CyberDyke Network.

A PornHub report indicates that "lesbian", "orgy", "BDSM" are the most popular category for female viewers of its porn portal. The category was 151% more popular with women than with men.

 Mainstream inauthenticity 
Mainstream lesbian pornography is criticized by some members of the lesbian community for its inauthenticity. According to author Elizabeth Whitney, "lesbianism is not acknowledged as legitimate" in lesbian porn due to the prevalence of "heteronormatively feminine women", the experimental nature, and the constant catering to the male gaze, all of which counter real life lesbianism.

A study conducted by Valerie Webber found that most actors in lesbian porn consider their own pornographic sex somewhere on a spectrum between real and fake sex, depending on several factors. They were more likely to consider it authentic if there was a real attraction between themselves and the other actor(s) in the scene, and if they felt mutual respect between themselves and the producers.

Authenticity in porn is disputed because some assert that the only authentic sex has no motive other than sex itself. Porn sex, being shot for a camera, automatically has other motives than sex itself. On the other side, some assert that all porn sex is authentic since the sex is an occurrence that took place, and that is all that is needed to classify it as authentic.

With regard to the authenticity of their performance, some lesbian porn actors describe their performance as an exaggerated, altered version of their real personality, providing some authenticity to the performance. Authenticity depends on real life experiences, so some lesbian porn actors feel the need to create an entirely different persona in order to feel safe. Webber writes of Agatha, a queer actor in lesbian porn who "prefers that the activity and ambiance of her performances be very inauthentic, because otherwise it feels 'too close to home, referring to the oppression and verbal abuse she is subject to by homophobic men in her daily life.

 Penetration 
Like in straight and gay male porn, there is an emphasis on penetration in lesbian porn. Even though studies have found that dildos have minimal use in real life lesbian sexual activity, lesbian porn prominently features dildos. According to Lydon, the ability to achieve orgasm clitorally, as opposed to penetratively, eliminates the need for a phallus and, by extension, for a man. For this reason, male producers continue to include, and male viewers continue to demand, a phallus as a central feature in lesbian porn.

Views on lesbianism in erotica

Effects on heterosexual men

Several penile plethysmography studies have shown high levels of arousal in heterosexual men to pornography showing sexual activity between women. One study found heterosexual men to have the highest genital and subjective arousals to pornography depicting heterosexual activity, rather than lesbian activity, while another study reported that on average heterosexual men are more aroused by pornography showing sexual activity between women than they are by depictions of heterosexual activity. These findings correspond with reports in several earlier studies (summarized in Whitley et al. (1999); see also anecdotal reports in Loftus (2002)).
Male perception of lesbianism as erotic has been shown to correspond with recent exposure to lesbian pornography; however, men who have recently viewed lesbian pornography are no more likely than others to perceive lesbians as hypersexual and/or bisexual. Bernard E. Whitley, Jr., et al. hypothesized, upon reaching this conclusion, that "pornography may [...] lead heterosexual men to view lesbianism as erotic by means of a generalized association of female-female sexual activity with sexual arousal", but noted that "more research is needed to clarify the relationship between exposure to pornography and the perceived erotic value of lesbianism."

Enjoyment of lesbian pornography can have little connection to feelings towards homosexuals in real life. A heterosexual man may be aroused by pornographic depictions of lesbianism yet hold homophobic views. However, several studies suggest that men who perceive lesbianism as erotic may have less negative attitudes toward lesbians than they do toward gay men.Louderback LA, Whitley BE Jr. (1997). "Perceived erotic value of homosexuality and sex-role attitudes as mediators of sex differences in heterosexual college students' attitudes toward lesbians and gay men".  Journal of Sex Research 34: 175–182. (JSTOR link). Studies have further shown that, while men tend to correlate lesbianism with eroticism more often than women do, women perceive male homosexuality as erotic no more often than men do.

Feminist views

Lesbian views on sex between women in erotica are complex. Historically, women have been less involved in the production and consumption of erotica in general and visual pornography in particular than have men. Since the late 1960s, radical feminist objections to pornography and the sexual objectification of women have influenced the lesbian community, with some feminists objecting to all pornography. However, since the end of the 1980s' "Feminist Sex Wars" and the beginning of the "women's erotica" movement, feminist views on pornography, both lesbian and heterosexual, have shifted. 
Some lesbians are even consumers of mainstream pornography, but many dislike what they perceive as inaccurate and stereotypical depictions of women and lesbianism in mainstream pornography. Some are also uncomfortable with male interest in lesbians. As of the early 2000s, there is a very strong lesbian erotic literature movement, as well as a small genre of pornography made by lesbians for a lesbian audience.

An increasing amount of queer erotic literature has been released in recent decades, written by women and usually for women. There is a large sub-category of this erotica that involves various queer relationships while also including bisexuality and transgender characters into the writing. By introducing various other identities and sexualities, it opens up the erotica world to more gender-fluidity and acceptance of other queer or non-heteronormative sexualities.

See also

References

 

Further reading

 

Books

 
 
 
 
 
 

Journals

 
 
 
 
Reprinted in: 
Reprinted in: 
 
 
 
 
 
 
 

External links
 Erotic and Pornographic Art: Lesbian by Tasmin Wilton, glbtq, 2002.
 Pornographic Film and Video: Lesbian by Teresa Theophano, glbtq, 2002.
 "Kira Cochrane wishes Keira and Scarlett would stop it" by Kira Cochrane, New Statesman, February 27, 2006
 It's February; Pucker Up, TV Actresses by Virginia Heffernan, New York Times, February 10, 2005. (requires login)
 "Boogie Dykes: How two San Francisco independent filmmakers are changing the world of mainstream porn" by Michelle Tea, San Francisco Bay Guardian, January 31, 2001.
 "Celebrating Lesbian Sexuality: An Interview with Inoue Meimy, Editor of Japanese Lesbian Erotic Lifestyle Magazine Carmilla" interview by Katsuhiko Suganuma and James Welker, Intersections: Gender, History and Culture in the Asian Context'' 12, January 2006.

 
Pornography by genre
LGBT erotica
Lesbianism
Homosexuality